The 1991 British League Division Two season was contested as the second division of Speedway in the United Kingdom. The league had been renamed from the National League.

Summary
The title sponsored by Sunbrite was won by the Arena Essex Hammers. Hackney withdrew in July, ten matches into the season.

Final table

British League Division Two Knockout Cup
The 1991 British League Division Two Knockout Cup sponsored by Phonesport, was the 24th edition of the Knockout Cup for tier two teams. Arena Essex Hammers were the winners of the competition.

First round

Quarter-finals

Semi-finals

Final
First leg

Second leg

Final tied 90–90, replay required

Final replay
First leg

Second leg

Arena Essex were declared Knockout Cup Champions, winning on aggregate 100–80.

Leading averages

Riders & final averages
Arena Essex Hammers

Bo Petersen 10.54
Brian Karger 10.23
Alan Mogridge 8.85
Troy Pratt 7.45
Andy Galvin 7.43
Jan Pedersen 6.87
Paul Hurry 5.59
Colin White 5.45
Robert Ledwith 5.25
Tommy Palmer 1.54

Edinburgh

Les Collins 9.10
Michael Coles 7.97
Frede Schott 7.79
Brett Saunders 7.49 
Nigel Alderton 5.55
David Steen 4.98
Johnny Jorgensen 4.74
Justin Walker 4.62

Exeter

Steve Regeling 8.74
Peter Jeffery 8.08
Richard Green 7.80
David Smart 7.49
Colin Cook 6.48
Richard Knight 5.29
Mark Simmonds 5.20
Justin Elkins 3.45
Frank Smart 3.20

Glasgow

Steve Lawson 8.44 
Shane Bowes 8.38
Jason Lyons 7.82
Mark Courtney 7.21
Sean Courtney 6.76
Mick Powell 6.21
Brian Nixon 4.55

Hackney (withdrew from league)

Paul Whittaker 8.74 
Tony Olsson 7.79
Dave Hamnett 6.57
Vladimir Kalina 5.81
Michael Warren 5.38
Richard Hellsen 5.13
Pavel Karnas 4.36
Roland Pollard 2.25
Tim Hunter 2.21

Long Eaton

Jan Stæchmann 9.39
Carl Blackbird 8.73 
Kai Niemi 6.67
Gary O'Hare 5.66
Mark Blackbird 5.64
Peter McNamara 5.32
Rob Tilbury 4.74
Stuart Parnaby 2.69

Middlesbrough
 
Kenny McKinna 8.00
Steve Wilcock 6.88
Lars Munkedal 6.18
Mark Lemon 6.04
Duncan Chapman 5.26
Wayne Carter 5.25
Shawn Venables 4.55
Carsten Pelzmann 4.52
Chris Readshaw 2.87

Milton Keynes

Troy Butler 9.26
Jan Pedersen 7.93
Paul Woods 5.80
Peter Glanz 5.56
Jamie Habbin 5.37
Nigel De'ath 5.23
Justin Walker 4.77
Derrol Keats 3.78
Paul Blackbird 1.82

Newcastle

Mark Thorpe 9.93
David Bargh 9.55
Scott Lamb 7.32
Martin Dixon 6.23
Dave Hamnett 5.96
Phil Jeffrey 5.03
Richard Juul 4.03
Jamie Habbin 3.91
Max Schofield 2.76

Peterborough

Mikael Blixt 9.69
Stephen Davies 8.14
Richard Hellsen 7.44 
Scott Norman 6.12
Mark Lyndon 6.10
Kevin Jolly 5.75
Gary Tagg 5.14
Robbie Fuller 4.06
Roger Horspool 3.18
Tim Hunter 3.14

Rye House

Martin Goodwin 8.51
Jens Rasmussen 7.82
Trevor O'Brien 7.58
Melvyn Taylor 7.43
Roger Johns 5.44
Rob Tilbury 4.41
Wayne Baxter 3.73
John Wainwright 3.40

Sheffield

Neil Evitts 9.79
Peter Carr 9.36
Louis Carr 7.72
Ian Barney 7.51
Richard Musson 4.65
Simon Wolstenholme 4.57
Mark Hepworth 4.23
Richard Davidson 4.08
Ade Hoole 3.18

Stoke

Nigel Crabtree 8.30 
Eric Monaghan 8.07
Gary Chessell 6.96
Darren Standing 5.94
David Clarke 5.58
Garry Stead 5.08
Chris Cobby 4.87

See also
List of United Kingdom Speedway League Champions
Knockout Cup (speedway)

References

Speedway British League Division Two / National League